The Queensland Railways C17 class locomotive was a class of 4-8-0 steam locomotives operated by the Queensland Railways.

History
The C17 class was introduced as an improved version of the C16 class. Per Queensland Railway's classification system they were designated the C17 class, C representing they had four driving axles, and 17 representing the cylinder diameter in inches.

The design was so successful that 227 locomotives were built from 1920 when the first engine Nº 15 entering service  through until 1953 when Nº 1000 was delivered. The Commonwealth Railways NM class were of the same design.

They were used to haul Mail trains on lines could not accommodate heavier B18¼ class, also suburban passenger, mixed, goods and branch line trains. Until 1948 they were the heaviest engines that could work north of Mackay. Prior to the introduction of  diesel electric locomotives, they were responsible for hauling the air-conditioned Inlander, Midlander and Westlander trains for parts of their respective journeys.

First engines had large steam domes, open cabs and C16 style tenders. Those built from 1938 onwards, commencing with N°858, had small steam domes, sedan cabs with welded tenders and also larger diameter piston valves. The two types of boilers were occasionally interchanged at overhauls and by later years most of the old style ones had been replaced. The last 40 engines, Nº961 to Nº1000, were fitted with Timken roller bearings and painted brown. They acquired the nickname of Brown Bombers after American boxer Joe Louis. Those overhauled in the last years of steam operations were repainted black. A number of modifications were carried out over their life including the fitting of large mushroom air snifting valves. Several had additional sandboxes and/or rear headlights fitted at various times for working lines where no turning facilities were available.

On 5 May 1947, C17 class locomotive 824 left the rails near Camp Mountain on the Dayboro line claiming the lives of 16 people and 38 injured. The Commonwealth Department of Trade & Customs Recreation and Social Club had chartered the train for a picnic at Closeburn. Negotiating a sharp curve at excessive speed caused the tragedy. The locomotive was repaired and continued in service until May 1967 when it was transferred to Injune along the recently closed line.

Preservation
Twenty-five have been preserved:
2 at the North Ipswich Railway Workshops
45 at Mary Valley Rattler
251 plinthed in Townsville
253 at Mary Valley Rattler
705 at Mary Valley Rattler, loaned to the Imbil Progress Association for display 
720 at the Australian Railway Historical Society
721 plinthed in Jandowae as 719 
761 currently undergoing overhaul at QPSR
763 at the Australian Railway Historical Society
802 at Downs Explorer
809 plinthed in Injune
812 at Downs Explorer
819 at Mary Valley Rattler
824 plinthed in Injune
934 at Zig Zag Railway
935 at Downs Explorer 
944 at the Miles Historical Village and Museum
965 plinthed in Mundubbera
966 at Zig Zag Railway
967 at Mary Valley Rattler - operational
971 at Downs Explorer - undergoing restoration
974 at the Queensland Rail Heritage Division - undergoing maintenance
980 by the Blackwater Lions Club
988 at Archer Park Station & Steam Tram Museum, Rockhampton
996 at Mary Valley Rattler
1000 Queensland Rail Heritage Division, stored at the Workshops Rail Museum

References

External links

Armstrong Whitworth locomotives
Clyde Engineering locomotives
Railway locomotives introduced in 1920
C17
Walkers Limited locomotives
3 ft 6 in gauge locomotives of Australia
4-8-0 locomotives
Freight locomotives